A Fucking Cruel Nightmare is a 2010 German horror film directed by Sebastian Zeglarski. The film starring Raul Maximilian, Christian Nowak and Sebastian Zeglarski in the lead roles.

Cast
 Raul Maximilian
 Christian Nowak
 Sebastian Zeglarski

References

External links
 

English-language German films
2010 films
German horror films
2010s English-language films
2010s German films